Kovaçica or Kovačica (Serbian Cyrillic: Ковачица), is a village in the municipality of Mitrovica in the District of Mitrovica, Kosovo. According to the 2011 census, it has 27 inhabitants, all Albanians.

See also
Populated places in Kosovo

Notes

References 

Villages in Mitrovica, Kosovo